The Long Road Home is an American drama miniseries created by Mikko Alanne. It is based on the 2007 book The Long Road Home: A Story of War and Family by Martha Raddatz, which tells the story of a U.S. Army unit during the first day of the siege of Sadr City in 2004. The series stars Michael Kelly, Jason Ritter, Kate Bosworth, Sarah Wayne Callies, Jeremy Sisto, Noel Fisher, Jon Beavers, E. J. Bonilla, Jorge Diaz, Ian Quinlan, Darius Homayoun and Patrick Schwarzenegger. The miniseries premiered on National Geographic on November 7, 2017.

Cast 
Michael Kelly as LTC Gary Volesky
Jason Ritter as Troy Denomy
Kate Bosworth as Gina Denomy 
Sarah Wayne Callies as Leann Volesky
Jeremy Sisto as SGT Robert Miltenberger
Noel Fisher as PFC Tomas Young 
Jon Beavers as SGT Eric Bourquin
E. J. Bonilla as LT Shane Aguero
Jorge Diaz as SPC Israel Garza
Ian Quinlan as SPC Robert Arsiaga
Darius Homayoun as Jassim Al-Lani
Patrick Schwarzenegger as SGT Ben Hayhurst
Katherine Willis as Cathy Smith
Franklin Silverio as SPC Acevedo
Joshua Brennan as SGT Jackson
Joey Luthman as SPC Jonathan Riddell
Thomas McDonell as SPC Carl Wild
Devonne Palmer as CPL Allan Alexander
Charlie Parrish as Burkholder
Micah Pediford as CPL Coleman
Devyn Placide as PVT Derrick Perry
Alex Ross as SFC Jerry Swope
Ezekiel Z. Swinford as SPC Matt Fisk
Roland Buck III as SPC Rafael Martin
May Calamawy as Faiza
Rana Haddad as Samira
Peter Malek as Essam
Laith Nakli as Alim
Bruce Peacock as SSG Haubert
Carter Redwood as Pedro Guzman
Jill Blackwood as Belinda Miltenberger
Mike Davis as CPT Dylan Randazzo
Andrew Michael Johnson as SPC Joshua Rogers 
Ian Pala as SPC Seth Weibley
Christopher Dontrell Piper as SGT Reginald Butler
John Trentacoste Jr. as SPC Sean Crabbe
Luis Amory as SGT Miranda
Brandon Charles Chesser as SPC Jonathan Denny
Karina Ortiz as Lupita Garza
Sebastian Cook as Denomy's Soldier
Kenny Leu as SGT Eddie Chen
Parker Weathersbee as Elijah Aguero
Roby Attal as CPT David Mathias
Josh Cavazos as LT Clay Spicer
David DeLao as Chaplain Pena
Cotie Domm as PFC Luke Fournier
Garrett Graham as CPT John Moore
Charlotte Delaney Riggs as Chapel Kid 
Gurie Sheffield as SFC Butler
Oriana Ledesma as High-school Student and Denomy’s Soldier
Duncan Coe as LT Cannon
Patrick Gathron as SPC Ahmed Cason
Joshua Phipps as SPC Stephen Hiller
Rochelle Robinson as Cindy Sheehan
Josh Vinyard as Jerry Bune
Josh Blaylock as SPC Packwood
Rumor Ledesma as Child Church Attendee

Episodes

Reception

Critical reception 
Maureen Ryan writing for Variety gave the show a mixed review pointing out some strengths but perceiving it to be painful to watch and propagandistic in tone at times with major weaknesses throughout. She lauds the show's success at depicting the logistics of war and creating empathy for American soldiers and the ethical choices they were faced with during their missions in the US Invasion of the Iraq. She however finds that these intimate psychological portrayals of extreme situations lack well written characterisations of the protagonists one is made to empathise with, though she does laud the actors for their performances of these roles finding the fault in the writing of the show. To her dialogue is cumbersome and cliché and the scenes away from the battlefield are superfluous and needlessly stretch the show's runtime thereby sacrificing a lot of its watchability. Ryan observes the tone of the show to at times be highly propagandistic making the show itself almost feel like propaganda for either the United States Army or a "narrowly defined vision of America" whose ability to create any kind of poignant psychological effect however is foiled by the show's generic and predictable writing outside of combat scenes. According to her the show at times attempts to create empathy for the Iraqis and their experience of the invasion and subsequent massacres. These attempts fall short based on a lack of development for any single Iraqi character; a quality they supposedly share with most characters in the show.

Awards and nominations

References

External links
 
 

2010s American drama television miniseries
2017 American television series debuts
2017 American television series endings
English-language television shows
Iraq War in television
National Geographic (American TV channel) original programming
War television series